This list of  churches in Roskilde Municipality''' lists Church buildings in Roskilde Municipality, Denmark.

Church of Denmark

Roman–Catholic

References